Gosset is a surname. Notable people with the surname include:

Danny Gosset (born 1994), professional footballer
David Gosset (born 1970), global affairs analyst 
Éléonore Gosset (born 1977), French actress
Gosset (cartoonist) (circa 1933-2018), Spanish cartoonist
Thorold Gosset (1869–1962), English lawyer and amateur mathematician 
Ulysse Gosset (born 1955), French journalist and news anchor 
W. D. Gosset,  Surveyor General of Ceylon
William Sealy Gosset (1876–1937), English chemist and statistician

See also
Gossett